The men's 1500 metres event  at the 1978 European Athletics Indoor Championships was held on 11 and 12 March in Milan.

Medalists

Results

Heats
First 2 from each heat (Q) and the next 2 fastest (q) qualified for the final.

Note: The judges had the competitors in heat 3 run one extra lap by mistake, so no times were recorded. After much deliberation and protests, it was decided to let four runners from that heat to the final.

Final

References

1500 metres at the European Athletics Indoor Championships
1500